W. Patrick Murphy (born 1963) is a career U.S. diplomat.  A Senior Foreign Service Officer, he served as the Principal Deputy Assistant Secretary of State for the Bureau of East Asian and Pacific Affairs from 2018 to 2019, fulfilling the duties of Acting Assistant Secretary, and Deputy Assistant Secretary of State for Southeast Asia and Multilateral Affairs, 2016–2018. He previously served as Chargé d'affaires and Deputy Chief of Mission in the Kingdoms of Thailand and Lesotho. He was nominated on January 16, 2019 to be Ambassador Extraordinary and Plenipotentiary of the United States of America to the Kingdom of Cambodia.

Early life and education
Murphy was raised and educated in Vermont, graduating from Brattleboro Union High School (BUHS). In 1985, he obtained a B.A. from the University of Vermont in Political Science and Canadian Studies.

Following his graduation from UVM, Murphy served as a Peace Corps Volunteer in Cameroon and obtained an M.A. in 1991 in International Relations and Canadian Studies from the School of Advanced International Studies (SAIS) at Johns Hopkins University. In 2009, Murphy received a M.S. as a distinguished graduate in National Security Strategy from the National War College.

Diplomatic career
Since his first mission at the U.S. Consulate General in Guangzhou, China, Murphy has completed diplomatic assignments in Thailand, Burma (Myanmar), Iraq, Lesotho, Guinea, and Mali. His experience also includes various positions in Washington, including Acting Special Representative and Policy Coordinator for Burma, Office for Mainland Southeast Asia Director, senior political advisor for the Haiti Working Group, and desk officer for Burma, and Laos.

Murphy's nomination to be the U.S. ambassador to Cambodia was submitted to the Senate on August 16, 2018. He appeared before the Senate Committee on Foreign Relations on December 4, but no further action was taken during the 115th Congress. Murphy's nomination was resubmitted to the 116th Congress on January 16, 2019, and reported favorably by the Senate Committee on Foreign Relations on April 3. It was confirmed by voice vote of the full Senate on August 1, 2019. Murphy presented his credentials to Cambodian King Norodom Sihamoni on October 19, 2019.

List of diplomatic missions
2019–present: Ambassador to Cambodia 
July 2018–June 2019: Principal Deputy Assistant Secretary of State for East Asian and Pacific Affairs (Acting Assistant Secretary)
2016–2018: Deputy Assistant Secretary of State for Southeast Asia and Multilateral Affairs
2013–2016: Deputy Chief of Mission and Chargés d'affaires ad interim (2014-2015), Embassy Bangkok, Thailand
2012–2013: Special Representative and Policy Coordinator for Burma, Acting
2011–2012: Director, Mainland Southeast Asia
2010–2011: Deputy Director, Mainland Southeast Asia
2009–2010: Team Leader, Ninewa Provincial Reconstruction Team, Iraq
2006–2008: Deputy Chief of Mission and Chargé, Embassy Maseru, Lesotho
2003–2006: Political and Economic Counselor, Embassy Rangoon, Burma
2000–2002: Senior Advisor, Haiti Working Group
1998–2000: Burma and Laos Desk Officer
1995–1998: Political and Economic Chief, Embassy Conakry, Guinea
1993–1995: Vice Consul, Consulate General Guangzhou, China
1990: Graduate intern, Political and Economic Section, Embassy Bamako, Mali

Awards and honors
Murphy received a dozen of the Department of State's commendations, including the Department of the Army's Superior Civilian Service Award and the National Defense University President's Award. He was also a finalist for the Secretary of State's 2005 Human Rights and Democracy Achievement Award.

Publications
Murphy, W. Patrick, & Vandal, Thomas (2010, July 15). Winning in Iraq by Working Together. The Washington Times. Sewell, John W., & Murphy, W. Patrick (1992). The United States and Japan in Southeast Asia: Is a Shared Development Agenda Possible? The U.S.-Japan Economic Relationship in East and Southeast Asia, XIV(1), Significant Issues Series, 115–138. Asia-Pacific Association of Japan and the Center for Strategic and International Studies.

Personal life
Murphy speaks French, Burmese, Cantonese, and Spanish. He and his wife Kathleen have one son, Seamus, and two daughters, Meghan and Gillian.

References

Living people
Ambassadors of the United States to Cambodia
National War College alumni
Paul H. Nitze School of Advanced International Studies alumni
University of Vermont alumni
21st-century American diplomats
20th-century American diplomats
People from Windham County, Vermont
United States Foreign Service personnel
Peace Corps volunteers
1963 births